Arthur Girling (1807 – June 1849) was an English first-class cricketer and umpire.

Girling was born at Burton upon Trent in 1807. He made his debut in first-class cricket for the North against the Marylebone Cricket Club (MCC) at Lord's in 1841, with Girling also featuring in the return fixture at Burton-on-Trent. He next played first-class cricket in 1845, when he appeared for Manchester against Yorkshire at Manchester. He played first-class cricket for Manchester until 1848, making six appearances. Playing as a bowler for Manchester, he took a total of 34 wickets at an average of 11.05, with best figures of 6 for 32. These figures came against Sheffield in 1848, a match in which he took two five-wicket hauls. He also stood as an umpire in two first-class matches in 1840 and 1841. Girling died at Manchester in June 1849.

References

External links

1807 births
1849 deaths
Sportspeople from Burton upon Trent
English cricket umpires
English cricketers
North v South cricketers
Manchester Cricket Club cricketers
Date of birth missing
Date of death missing